The chapters of the manhua series 1/2 Prince are written by Yu Wo and illustrated by Choi Hong Chong. The series follows Feng Lan who becomes the first female to have a male character in the game Second Life, a 99.9% realistic virtual reality game. Once in the game as the hot bishōnen named Prince, Feng Lan begins her adventure.



Volume list

(The release data is same as the 1/2 Prince manhua Chinese version)

References

Action-adventure comics
Fantasy comics
Manhua
Romance comics
Science fiction comics
Tong Li Publishing titles